Guatemalan may refer to:
 Something of, from, or related to the country of Guatemala
 A person from Guatemala, or of Guatemalan descent. For information about the Guatemalan people, see Demographics of Guatemala and Culture of Guatemala. For specific persons, see List of Guatemalans.
 Note that there is no language called "Guatemalan".  See Languages of Guatemala.
 Guatemalan cuisine

Language and nationality disambiguation pages